Rustam Amirkhanovich Gadzhiyev (born 13 January 1978) is a retired Russian professional football player.

Club career
He made his Russian Football National League debut for FC Dynamo Makhachkala on 4 September 2004 in a game against FC Sokol Saratov. He played one more season in the FNL for Dynamo.

External links
 

1978 births
Footballers from Makhachkala
Living people
Russian footballers
Association football defenders
FC Dynamo Barnaul players
FC Anzhi Makhachkala players
FC Baikal Irkutsk players
FC Khimik Dzerzhinsk players
FC Mashuk-KMV Pyatigorsk players
FC Dynamo Makhachkala players